Pingliang Road is a Shanghai Metro station on Line 18 within Yangpu District, Shanghai.

Places nearby 
It is located near the administrative buildings of Yangpu District.

References 

Railway stations in Shanghai
Shanghai Metro stations in Yangpu District
Line 18, Shanghai Metro
Railway stations in China opened in 2021